Kota Tambolaka (Tambolaka city) is the administrative capital of the Southwest Sumba Regency (Kabupaten Sumba Barat Daya), on the island of Sumba, East Nusa Tenggara province of Indonesia. Tambolaka was in fact the name of the airport, the real former name of the city being Waitabula (sometimes written Weetabula).

Climate
Tambolaka has a tropical savanna climate (Köppen Aw) with moderate to little rainfall from May to November and heavy rainfall from December to April.

Transportation
The town is served by Tambolaka Airport.

References

Populated places in East Nusa Tenggara
Regency seats of East Nusa Tenggara
Geography of Sumba